Nikulino is a rural locality (a village) in Mayskoye Rural Settlement, Vologodsky District, Vologda Oblast, Russia. The population was 12 as of 2002.

Geography 
The distance to Vologda is 13.6 km, to Maysky is 4 km. Ivlevo is the nearest rural locality.

References 

Rural localities in Vologodsky District